Edward Q Wagner  (1855, Germany – 1922, Detroit, United States) was a German-American sculptor.

Early years
Wagner had immigrated from Germany to the United States by 1871 settling in Detroit, Michigan. After arriving in Detroit he studied with Detroit sculptor Julius Melchers (father of painter Gari Melchers). He also studied in New York City.

As a sculptor in Detroit he was involved in several partnerships, Wagner and Reuther  (1885–1887) and Wagner and Volbracht (1890–1895).  He and his various firms created wood carvings for churches as well as stone architectural commissions.  His best known work is the architectural sculpture, notably the Anthony Wayne pediment, on the Wayne County Building, constructed from 1897 to 1902.

In 1906 Wagner entered a competition to create a statue of General Alexander Macomb for the city of Detrtoit. The judges for the contest were  Charles F. McKim, Daniel H. Burnham, and Augustus Saint-Gaudens. It was won by New York City sculptor Adolph Alexander Weinman, who had both studied with and served as an assistant to St. Gaudens, Weinman had also created many commissions for McKim's, firm, McKim, Mead and White and who certainly was better known to Burnham than was Wagner.

Wagner worked generating architectural sculpture at both the World's Columbian Exposition in Chicago in 1893 and the St. Louis Exposition in St Louis in 1904.

He was employed by the government of Brazil and spent five years in Rio de Janeiro.

On August 17, 1937, the Detroit News, as part a story "Contributions to Detroit Art Recalled by Barlow's Death" contained the following sentence:

Edward Wagner's sculpture adorned some of the most imposing buildings in far parts of the earth.

References

Falk, Peter Hastings, Editor Who Was Who in American Art,  Sound View Press, Madison Connecticut, 1985
Farbman, Suzy and James P. Gallagher, The Renaissance of the Wayne County Building, Smith Hinchman & Grylls, Inc, The old Wayne County Building Limited Partnership and Walbridge Aldinger Company, Detroit, Michigan,  1989
Ferry, W. Hawkins, The Buildings of Detroit: A History, Wayne State University Press, Detroit, Michigan, 1968
Gibson, Arthur Hopkin, Artists of Early Michigan: A Biographical Dictionary of Artists Native to or Active in Michigan, 1701-1900, Wayne State University Press, Detroit,  1975
Kvaran and Lockley, A Guide to Architectural Sculpture in America, unpublished manuscript
Nawrocki, Dennis Alan and Thomas J. Holleman, Art in Detroit Public Places, Wayne State University Press, Detroit, Michigan,  1980
Opitz, Glenn B, Editor, Mantle Fielding's Dictionary of American Painters, Sculptors & Engravers,  Apollo Book, Poughkeepsie NY, 1986

External links
http://www.barlowgenealogy.com/Families/MyronBarlow/Myron.html
https://web.archive.org/web/20070928065530/http://detroithistorical.org/collections/vewebsite2/exhibit3/e30012b.htm

1973 deaths
American architectural sculptors
German emigrants to the United States
Artists from Detroit
1855 births
20th-century American sculptors
20th-century American male artists
19th-century American sculptors
American male sculptors
Sculptors from Michigan
19th-century American male artists